The toothbrush fence is a roadside attraction in Te Pahu, Waikato, New Zealand.

Graeme Cairns built the fence in 2006 as an absurdist art project, and hung hundreds of toothbrushes along a wire fence located on a quiet rural road.  

The fence was made famous on the HBO show Flight of the Conchords. Rhys Darby's character  Murray Hewitt, who plays the Deputy Cultural Attaché at the New Zealand consulate, references the fence on the episode "Bret Gives Up the Dream" as a major New Zealand attraction. "We've got interesting attractions: a toothbrush fence," Murray exclaims. "Imagine that, a whole fence made out of toothbrushes!"

References

External links
 Toothbrush Fence, official site

2006 establishments in New Zealand
Fences
Tourist attractions in New Zealand